The 1954 Meath Intermediate Football Championship is the 28th edition of the Meath GAA's premier club Gaelic football tournament for intermediate graded teams in County Meath, Ireland. The tournament consists of 8 teams. The championship applied a league format.

Slane were regraded from the 1953 S.F.C. 

At the end of the season Dunderry and Kilcloon applied to be regraded to the 1955 J.F.C.

Ballinlough claimed their 1st Intermediate championship title after finishing top of the table. Their triumph was sealed by the defeat of Slane 4-11 to 1-9 at Pairc Tailteann on 29 August 1954.

Team changes
 

The following teams have changed division since the 1953 championship season.

From I.F.C.
Promoted to 1954 S.F.C.
 St. Vincent's

Relegated to 1954 J.F.C.
 Carnaross
 Castletown
 Donore
 Kilberry
 Longwood

To I.F.C.
Regraded from 1953 S.F.C.
 Slane

Promoted from 1953 J.F.C.
 Drumbaragh - (Junior Runners-Up & Kells District Champions)
 Navan O'Mahonys 'B' - (Junior Quarter-Finalists & Navan District Champions)

Strangely, neither of the 1953 J.F.C. Semi-Finalists Shale Rovers (North Meath District Champions) nor Curraha (Tara District Champions) were promoted.

League Table & Fixtures/Results
The club with the best record were declared I.F.C. champions. Many results were unavailable in the Meath Chronicle.

Round 1:
 Ballinlough 3-4, 1-2 Navan O'Mahonys 'B', Kells, 28/2/1954,
 Slane -vs- Ballinabrackey, Trim, 28/2/1954,
 Drumbaragh 0-11, 2-1 Kilcloon, Skryne, 7/3/1954,
 Duleek -vs- Dunderry, Skryne, 7/3/1954,

Round 2:
 Duleek 1-8, 0-1 Kilcloon, Pairc Tailteann, 21/3/1954,
 Drumbaragh -vs- Ballinabrackey, Ballivor, 11/4/1954,
 Ballinlough 2-6, 0-8 Dunderry, Kells, 25/4/1954,
 Slane 1-5, 1-1 Navan O'Mahonys 'B', Stackallen, 2/5/1954,

Round 3:
 Ballinlough 0-4, 1-1 Duleek, Pairc Tailteann, 2/5/1954,
 Slane 0-8, 2-1 Drumbaragh, Pairc Tailteann, 16/5/1954,
 Dunderry -vs- Kilcloon, Rathmolyon, 23/5/1954,
 Navan O'Mahonys 'B' -vs- Ballinabrackey,

Round 4:
 Ballinlough 2-9, 0-3 Ballinabrackey, Ballivor, 20/6/1954,
 Duleek 1-6, 1-3 Drumbaragh, Pairc Tailteann, 18/7/1954,
 Slane 3-6, 0-4 Dunderry, Kilberry, 18/7/1954,
 Navan O'Mahonys 'B' -vs- Kilcloon,

Round 5:
 Duleek 2-2, 2-2 Ballinabrackey, Warrenstown, 15/8/1954,
 Ballinalough -vs- Drumbaragh,
 Navan O'Mahonys 'B' -vs- Dunderry,
 Slane -vs- Kilcloon,

Round 6:
 Ballinlough 4-11, 1-9 Slane, Pairc Tailteann, 29/8/1954,
 Ballinabrackey -vs- Kilcloon, Enfield, 29/8/1954,
 Drumbaragh -vs- Dunderry,
 Duleek -vs- Navan O'Mahonys 'B',

Round 7:
 Ballinlough w, l Kilcloon,
 Ballinabrackey -vs- Dunderry,
 Drumbaragh -vs- Navan O'Mahonys 'B',
 Slane -vs- Duleek,

References

External links

Meath Intermediate Football Championship
Meath Intermediate Football Championship